Yvon Petit (14 October 1945 – 14 February 2014) was a French rower. He competed in the men's coxless four event at the 1968 Summer Olympics.

References

1945 births
2014 deaths
French male rowers
Olympic rowers of France
Rowers at the 1968 Summer Olympics
Sportspeople from Nantes